Ab Shirin or Abshirin may refer to:
 Ab Shirin, Firuzabad, Fars Province
 Ab Shirin, Mamasani, Fars Province
 Ab Shirin, Hormozgan
 Ab Shirin, Isfahan
 Ab Shirin, Kohgiluyeh and Boyer-Ahmad
 Ab Shirin, Sistan and Baluchestan

See also
 Shirin Ab (disambiguation)